Tetragonoderus columbicus is a species of beetle in the family Carabidae. It was described by Steinheil in 1875.

References

columbicus
Beetles described in 1875